The 2015 Big League World Series took place from July 28 - August 4 in Easley, South Carolina, United States. Guayama, Puerto Rico defeated Thousand Oaks, California in the championship game.

A modified double-elimination format was introduced this year.

Teams

Results

United States Bracket

International Bracket

Consolation round

Elimination Round

References

Big League World Series
Big League World Series
Big League